Alvin Ng is a Hong Kong male singer, host and actor under TVB and TVB Music Group who debuted in 2017 with the debut single, "How Can I Do".

In 2014, he participated in The Voice (Season 4) and came with 12th place  He then won the 3rd place in TVB International Chinese New Talent Singing Championship in 2016.

Early life 
He was graduated from Shek Lei Catholic Primary School, Tung Wah Group of Hospitals Mrs. Wu York Yu Memorial College and Dirigo High School. He was then promoted to University of Maine.

Career

2014-2016: The Voice 4 and TVB International Chinese New Talent Singing Championship 
In 2014, he returned to Hong Kong from the United States to develop his career. He was then taken part in The Voice (Season 4) and ended up with 12th place. Later, he was signed to TVB.

In 2015, he was assigned to study in the TVB Acting Training Course. Also, he was selected to be host of the show, "Music Power". At the same time, he uploaded covers and music videos on YouTube.

In June 2016, he announced he had signed the record deal with Voice Entertainment.

2017-2018: Debut as singer and actor 
In August 2017, he was debuted as a singer with the single, "How Can I Do".

In November 2018, he was featured in the TV series, "Wife Interrupted". According to Alvin, he replaced Dickson Yu because Dickson was passed out on August; it was also the first time for him to take up important role.

Discography

Singles

Soundtracks

Filmography

Television dramas

Television appearances

Hosting

Awards and nominations 

|- align="center"
| rowspan="4"| 2017
| "How Can I Do"
| Jade Solid Gold Songs
| Jade Solid Gold Songs Selection
| 
| Round 2
| 
|- align="center"
| 
| Most Promising New Artist
| 40th RTHK Top 10 Gold Songs Awards
| .mybgcolor {background-color:#CD7F32;} style="background: #CD7F32"|Bronze Award
|
| 
|- align="center" 
| "How Can I Do"
| Jade Solid Gold Songs
| rowspan="2"| Jade Solid Gold Best Ten Music Awards Presentation
| 
| 
| rowspan="2"|
|- align="center"
| 
| Most Popular Newcomer
| .mybgcolor {background-color:#CD7F32;} style="background: #CD7F32"|Bronze Award
|
|- align="center"
| rowspan="3"| 2018
| "More Than Friends"
| rowspan="2"| Jade Solid Gold Songs
| rowspan="2"| Jade Solid Gold Songs Selection
| 
| rowspan="2"| Round 1
| rowspan="2"| 
|- align="center"
| "Holiday"
| 
|- align="center"
| "Once Again"
| Best Soundtrack
| TVB Awards Presentation 2018
| 
| 
| 
|- align="center"
| rowspan="4"| 2019
| "More Than Friends"
| rowspan="2"| Jade Solid Gold Best Songs
| rowspan="3"| Jade Solid Gold Best Ten Music Awards Presentation
| 
|
| rowspan="3"| 
|- align="center"
| "Holiday"
| 
|
|- align="center"
| 
| Rising Artist of the Year
| .mybgcolor {background-color:#C0C0C0;} style="background: #C0C0C0"|Silver Award
|
|- align="center"
| "Once Again"
| Jade Solid Gold Songs
| Jade Solid Gold Songs Selection
| 
| Round 1
| 
|- align="center"

Notes

References 

1994 births
Living people
Hong Kong male actors
21st-century Hong Kong male actors
Hong Kong male television actors
TVB actors
21st-century Hong Kong male singers